The Infantry Division Scharnhorst was an infantry division of the German Wehrmacht during World War II. It was formed in late March 1945 as one of the last new divisions of the Wehrmacht before the end of the war.

The division was named after Prussian military reformer and army general Gerhard von Scharnhorst (1755–1813).

History 
The Infantry Division Scharnhorst was formed on 30 March 1945 in the Dessau area in Wehrkreis XI as part of the 35th Aufstellungswelle. It was formed from high school students throughout Wehrkreis XI, as well as remnants of the 167th Infantry Division and the 340th Infantry Division. The division's commander was Heinrich Götz. The division was first deployed in combat on 12 April near Barby against U.S. Army forces and was then deployed against the Red Army as part of the 12th Army near Beelitz on 26 April. The Infantry Division Scharnhorst was captured by American forces in Tangermünde on 2 May 1945.

Noteworthy individuals 

 Heinrich Götz, divisional commander.

References 

Infantry divisions of Germany during World War II
Military units and formations established in 1945
Military units and formations disestablished in 1945